Walter Dropo (Valter Dropo; January 30, 1923 – December 17, 2010), nicknamed "Moose", was an American college basketball standout and a professional baseball first baseman. During a 13-year career in Major League Baseball, he played for the Boston Red Sox (1949–1952), Detroit Tigers (1952–1954), Chicago White Sox (1955–1958), Cincinnati Redlegs (1958–1959) and Baltimore Orioles (1959–1961).

Youth
Dropo's Serbian parents emigrated from Trebinje, then part of the Kingdom of Yugoslavia (now part of Bosnia and Herzegovina), to start a new life. His father, Sava, worked at the local textile mill while also running their Connecticut family farm. Walter was raised in Moosup, Connecticut, where he played sandlot baseball with his brothers Milton and George, and attended Plainfield High School in the Central Village district of Plainfield, Connecticut, before attending the University of Connecticut.

College career
While at the University of Connecticut Dropo played for the football team, basketball team and baseball team. Dropo left UConn as the school's all-time leading scorer in basketball. Dropo was drafted in the first round of the 1947 BAA Draft by the Providence Steamrollers with the fourth overall pick. Dropo was also drafted by the Chicago Bears in the 9th round of the 1946 NFL Draft.

Professional career
Listed at 6'5", 220 lb (100 kg), Walter turned down offers from the Bears and the Providence Steamrollers, in order to sign with the Red Sox as an amateur free agent in 1947. He debuted on April 19, 1949, and in 11 games batted .146 (6-for-41).  Before that, he played first base briefly for the Red Sox farm team the Birmingham, Ala. Barons of the Southern Association double-A League.  

In 1950, Dropo led the league in RBIs (144) and total bases (326), while batting .322 and hitting 34 home runs, (second only to Al Rosen 37). In addition, his .583 slugging percentage and 70 extra base hits were second only to the .585 – 75 of Joe DiMaggio, and his .961 OPS finished third in the league, after Larry Doby (.986) and DiMaggio (.979). Dropo finished sixth in American League Most Valuable Player award, and earned AL Rookie of the Year honors, ahead of Whitey Ford. His efforts that season led to his only All-Star appearance.

In 1951, Dropo fractured his right wrist and never had another season the equal of his 1950 campaign. After another one-plus season, he was traded to Detroit on June 3, 1952. After being traded, he collected 12 consecutive hits to tie the MLB record. Included in the streak was a 5-for-5 game against the Yankees (July 14) and a 4-for-4 performance in the first game of a doubleheader against Washington (July 15). In the second game, he went 4-for-5, hitting on his first three at bats and popping out on his fourth at bat on the 7th inning, matching an American League record of 15 hits in four games. In that season, he hit a combined 29 home runs and 97 RBIs, but would never again hit over 19 homers (1955) or bat over .281 (1954).

In a 13-season career, Dropo batted .270 (1,113-for-4,124) with 152 home runs, 704 RBIs, 478 runs, 168 doubles, 22 triples and five stolen bases in 1,288 games. Defensively, in 1,174 games as a first baseman, he compiled a .992 fielding percentage.

Career highlights
 Rookie of the Year (1950)
 All-Star (1950)
 Top 10 MVP (sixth, 1950)
 Led league in RBIs (144, 1950)
 Led league in total bases (326, 1950)
 Tied an MLB record with 12 consecutive at-bats with a hit (July 15, 1952)
 Tied an MLB record with 12 consecutive plate appearances with a hit (July 15, 1952)
 Tied an AL record with 15 hits in four games (July 16, 1952)
 Dropo was the first rookie to top 100 RBIs with more RBIs than games played (144 in 136 games, 1950)
 Red Sox rookie record for home runs in a season, with 34.
 The first Red Sox player to be named the American League Rookie of the Year, followed by Don Schwall (1961), Carlton Fisk (1972), Fred Lynn (1975), Nomar Garciaparra (1997), and Dustin Pedroia (2007).

Death
Dropo died of natural causes on December 17, 2010, at the age of 87.
His funeral service was held at the Serbian Orthodox Church he helped found at 41 Alewife Brook Parkway, Cambridge, Massachusetts. He was laid to rest at Evergreen Cemetery in Plainfield, Connecticut.

See also
 List of Major League Baseball individual streaks
 List of Major League Baseball annual runs batted in leaders

References

External links

1923 births
2010 deaths
American League All-Stars
American League RBI champions
American men's basketball players
American people of Serbian descent
Baltimore Orioles players
Baseball players from Connecticut
Birmingham Barons players
Boston Red Sox players
Chicago White Sox players
Cincinnati Redlegs players
Detroit Tigers players
Louisville Colonels (minor league) players
Major League Baseball first basemen
Major League Baseball Rookie of the Year Award winners
People from Marblehead, Massachusetts
People from Plainfield, Connecticut
Providence Steamrollers draft picks
Sacramento Solons players
San Diego Padres (minor league) players
Scranton Red Sox players
Sportspeople from Essex County, Massachusetts
Sportspeople from Windham County, Connecticut
UConn Huskies baseball players
UConn Huskies football players
UConn Huskies men's basketball players